Conrad Ta'akimoeaka (born 25 October 1984) is a former Samoa international rugby league footballer who played as a .

Background
Ta'akimoeaka was born in Auckland, New Zealand. He is of Samoan descent.

Career
He was contracted to the Canterbury-Bankstown Bulldogs in the NRL.

References

External links
Bulldogs profile

1984 births
Living people
New Zealand sportspeople of Samoan descent
Samoa national rugby league team players
New Zealand expatriate rugby league players
Expatriate rugby league players in Australia
New Zealand expatriate sportspeople in Australia
Rugby league players from Auckland
Rugby league props